Kendriya Vidyalaya BHU  (KV-BHU) is situated in the city of Varanasi in the campus of Banaras Hindu University. The school is affiliated to CBSE and has classes running from 1 to 12. The regional office of Varanasi Region of KVS is located in the campus of this school. The school is an integral part of Kendriya Vidyalaya Sangathan. KV BHU is an autonomous body working under aegis of Ministry of Human Resource and Development, Govt of India.

The school has 4 houses namely Amartya Sen (Red), Raman (Green), Tagore (Yellow) and Malviya (Blue).
There is a student council which administers the school on student's basis.

Principal as well as teachers working in school in different subject.

School offers number of co-curricular and extra-curricular activities, Competitions and certain sports tournament held under KVS.

On 10+2 level school offers courses in Science, Commerce and Humanities. And also serves as the examination centre for CBSE exams, IIT exams and many more.

Curriculum
The curriculum is strictly based upon the policies of CBSE, the books of curriculum are of National Council of Educational Research and Training.

Awards
Accreditation by British Council, International School Awards.
Certain KVS regional and central incentive awards.

Students' Council

Student Council is elected every year by Principal and responsible teachers. They administer Vidyalaya at student basis. They are responsible for discipline, decorum and many other activities in school.

Post in Student Council are:-

School Captain

School Vice captain

School Sports Captain

House Captains

House vice captains

House Publication Captains

House Co-curricular activities captain

House Co-curricular activities Vice Captain

House Sports Captain

House Prefects

Notable alumni
Sanjay Mishra(actor)- Actor in Bollywood
Deepak Shukla- known for Herpesvirus entry receptor, virus host interactions, Herpes simplex keratitis.                                       
Jayant Narlikar-Indian Astrophysicist,Padma Bhushan,Padma Vibhushan

External links
 Kendriya Vidyalaya BHU

Kendriya Vidyalayas in Uttar Pradesh
Banaras Hindu University
Primary schools in Uttar Pradesh
High schools and secondary schools in Uttar Pradesh
Schools in Varanasi
Educational institutions established in 1965
1965 establishments in Uttar Pradesh